Andrew Clemence (born May 30, 1989) is an American professional racing cyclist.  He rode in the men's team time trial at the 2015 UCI Road World Championships. He previously cross country skied for University of New Hampshire between 2007–2011.

References

External links
 
 

1989 births
Living people
American male cyclists